The Korean War Memorial silver dollar is a commemorative silver dollar issued by the United States Mint in 1991.  The coin commemorated the 38th anniversary of the end of the Korean War.

Legislation 
The Korean War Veterans Memorial Thirty-Eighth Anniversary Commemorative Coin Act authorized the production of a silver dollar to commemorate the 38th anniversary of the ending of the  Korean War and in honor of those who served. The act allowed the coins to be struck in both proof and uncirculated finishes. The coins were released May 6, 1991.

Design 
The obverse of the coin was designed by John Mercanti.  It features a soldier climbing a hill with naval ships in the foreground, and two F-86 Sabres flying overhead.  The reverse was designed by T. James Ferrell, and features a map of Korea and the head of a Bald eagle.

Production and sales 
A maximum mintage of 1,000,000 Korean War Memorial dollars was authorized.  The coin was struck in two versions, a proof coin (struck at the Philadelphia Mint) and an uncirculated coin (struck at the Denver Mint).  Surcharges raised by the sale of the coins went towards the construction of the Korean War Veterans Memorial.

618,488 proof and 213,049 uncirculated coins were sold, for a total mintage of 831,537.

See also

 List of United States commemorative coins and medals (1990s)
 United States commemorative coins

References

1991 establishments in the United States
Korean War memorials and cemeteries
Modern United States commemorative coins